The Columbus mayoral election of 1999 was the 81st mayoral election in Columbus, Ohio.  It was held on Tuesday, November 2, 1999.  Republican party incumbent mayor Greg Lashutka retired from office after two consecutive terms in office.  Democratic party nominee Michael B. Coleman defeated Republican party nominee Dorothy Teater.  Coleman became the first African American elected as mayor of Ohio's capital city.

Primary results 
Columbus mayoral primaries are officially nonpartisan, but candidates are frequently endorsed by the parties with which they are affiliated. The two candidates who receive the most votes in the primary advance to the general election.

General election results

References

Bibliography

Mayoral elections in Columbus, Ohio
1999 Ohio elections
Columbus